Giovanni Testa (31 July 1903 – 18 October 1996) was an Italian cross-country skier. He competed in the men's 18 kilometre event at the 1928 Winter Olympics.

References

1903 births
1996 deaths
Italian male cross-country skiers
Olympic cross-country skiers of Italy
Cross-country skiers at the 1928 Winter Olympics
People from Graubünden